Isaac Lawrence Kumaning Mensah is a Ghanaian politician and member of the first parliament of the second republic of Ghana representing Bibiani constituency under the membership of the Progress Party.

Early life and education 
Mensah was born on 10 October 1932. He attended Westham College of Further Education (now Newham College of Further Education), and the University of London.He holds a Diploma in Public Administration, and a Diploma in Journalism. He later worked as a Journalist before going into Parliament.

Personal life 
He is Anglican in faith.

Politics 
He began his political career in 1969 when he became the parliamentary candidate for the Progress Party to represent the Bibiani constituency prior to the commencement of the 1969 Ghanaian parliamentary election.

He was sworn into the First Parliament of the Second Republic of Ghana on 1 October 1969, after being pronounced winner at the 1969 Ghanaian election held on 26 August 1969. His tenure of office  as a member of  parliament ended on 13 January 1972.

References 

1932 births
Ghanaian MPs 1969–1972
Living people
People from Western Region (Ghana)
Progress Party (Ghana) politicians